The 2000 Hart Council election took place on 4 May 2000 to elect members of Hart District Council in Hampshire, England. One third of the council was up for election and the council stayed under no overall control.

After the election, the composition of the council was:
Conservative 17
Liberal Democrat 12
Independent 5
Others 1

Election result

Ward results

References

2000
2000 English local elections
2000s in Hampshire